Massilia arvi is a Gram-negative, aerobic and non-motile bacterium from the genus Massilia which has been isolated from soil which was cultivated with Brassica oleracea.

References

Burkholderiales
Bacteria described in 2015